Aerographer's mate (abbreviated as AG) is a  United States Navy occupational rating.

Duties

Aerographer's mates:

 observe, collect, record and analyze meteorological and oceanographic data; 
 make visual and instrument observations of weather and sea conditions, surface and sub-surface; 
 operate meteorological satellite receivers and interpret and apply satellite data; 
 interpret and brief radar imagery and data; 
 interpret meteorological and oceanographic codes; 
 verify meteorological and oceanographic products; 
 evaluate recent meteorological and oceanographic developments for integration into local routines and enter data on appropriate charts; 
 operate ancillary equipment for the processing, dissemination and display of environmental data; 
 perform preventive maintenance on meteorological and oceanographic equipment; 
 prepare warnings of severe and hazardous weather and sea conditions; 
 forecast meteorological and oceanographic conditions; 
 prepare and present briefings concerning current and predicted environmental conditions and their effect on operations.

Training
AG "A" and "C" Schools are currently located in Biloxi, Mississippi, on Keesler Air Force Base. AG "A" School concentrates on weather observing and lasts approximately 3 months. AG "C" concentrates on weather forecasting and lasts approximately 9 months. Upon graduating from "A" school, AGs work toward qualification as environmental observers through completion of personnel qualification standards and job qualification requirements. They also prepare for advanced training at "C" school by the four- to six-year career stage. 

Aerographer's mates are assigned to larger ships such as aircraft carriers, amphibious ships, and cruisers, to naval air stations, weather centers, and other shore facilities in the United States or overseas. During a 20-year period in the Navy, AGs spend about 60 percent of their time assigned to shore units and 40 percent to fleet stations.

See also

List of United States Navy ratings
Weather observer

References

United States Navy ratings